Lake City Municipal Airport , also known as CJ Evans Field, is a public use airport located two nautical miles (4 km) southwest of the central business district of Lake City, in Florence County, South Carolina, United States. It is owned by the Town of Lake City.

Facilities and aircraft 
Lake City Municipal Airport covers an area of 39 acres (16 ha) at an elevation of 80 feet (24 m) above mean sea level. It has one runway designated 1/19 with an asphalt surface measuring 3,700 by 75 feet (1,128 x 23 m).

For the 12-month period ending 24 August 2016, the airport had 2,010 aircraft operations: 98.4% general aviation, 0.5% military, and 1.1% air taxi. At that time there were 10 aircraft based at this airport: 40% single-engine and 60% helicopter.

References

External links 
 Map of the airport from OpenStreetMap
 
 

Airports in South Carolina
Buildings and structures in Florence County, South Carolina
Transportation in Florence County, South Carolina